Fabrizio Di Mauro (born 18 June 1965) is an Italian former professional footballer who played as a midfielder. He is among the few players to play for both Roma and Lazio at senior level, winning his only honour with Roma in 1991, when the side won the Coppa Italia, also reaching the UEFA Cup final, only to lose out to Inter. He also spent a few seasons at Fiorentina, while he won three international caps with the Italy national football team, although he was not able to scorer any international goals. He was included in the Italian squad during the team's qualification campaign for the 1994 FIFA World Cup, but was not picked for the final squad, following a lack off regular match-practice with Lazio the same season.

Honours
Roma
 Coppa Italia: 1990–91

External links
 

1965 births
Living people
Italian footballers
Italy international footballers
Association football midfielders
Serie A players
Serie B players
A.S. Roma players
S.S. Arezzo players
U.S. Avellino 1912 players
ACF Fiorentina players
S.S. Lazio players
A.C. Reggiana 1919 players